Elections to Stevenage Council were held on 2 May 1996.  One third of the council was up for election; the seats which were last contested in 1992. The Labour party stayed in overall control of the council. The council was one of a number where the Conservatives lost their last seats.

After the election, the composition of the council was
Labour 38
Liberal Democrats 1

Election result

All comparisons in seats and vote share are to the corresponding 1992 election.

Ward results

Bandley Hill

Bedwell Plash

Chells

Longmeadow

Martins Wood

Mobbsbury

Note: Mobbsbury ward was won by Labour at the last regular election in 1992, but gained by the Liberal Democrats in an unscheduled election in 1994.

Monkswood

Old Stevenage

Pin Green

Roebuck

St Nicholas

Shephall

Symonds Green

References

1996
1996 English local elections
1990s in Hertfordshire